Russell Barr (born 15 October 1953) is a minister of the Church of Scotland, who was nominated in late 2015 to be the next Moderator of the General Assembly of the Church of Scotland.

Early life and education
Barr was born on 15 October 1953 in Kilmarnock, Scotland. He received a doctorate of ministry from Princeton Theological Seminary.

Ordained ministry
From 1993, he was the minister of Cramond Kirk in Edinburgh. He is chairman of the Edinburgh-based charity Fresh Start, which helps people who have been homeless establish themselves in their new home. Russell Barr retired as minister of Cramond Kirk in October 2020. 

In October 2015 he was nominated to succeed Right Rev Dr Angus Morrison as Moderator of the General Assembly of the Church of Scotland. He took office in May 2016. He was succeeded as Moderator by Dr Derek Browning in May 2017.

Personal life 
Barr is married to Margaret, a retired teacher.  They have one son and daughter.

See also 
 List of Moderators of the General Assembly of the Church of Scotland

References

External links 
 Fresh Start

1953 births
Living people
20th-century Ministers of the Church of Scotland
Princeton Theological Seminary alumni
Clergy from Edinburgh
Moderators of the General Assembly of the Church of Scotland
21st-century Ministers of the Church of Scotland